Lasocin  (formerly German Lessendorf) is a village in the administrative district of Gmina Kożuchów, within Nowa Sól County, Lubusz Voivodeship, in western Poland.

The village has a population of 192.

References

Lasocin